Michael Rector (born December 16, 1993) is a former American football wide receiver. He played college football at Stanford.

Professional career
Rector signed with the Detroit Lions as an undrafted free agent on May 12, 2017. He was waived by the Lions on September 2, 2017.

References

External links
Stanford Cardinals bio

1993 births
Living people
Stanford Cardinal football players
Detroit Lions players
American football wide receivers